The Norman and Marion Perry House is a historic house at 352 Ellsworth Hill Road in Campton, New Hampshire.  The house was built in 1960 to a design by Hugh Stubbins, and is a residential embodiment of Modernist architecture.  The property was landscaped by Leon Pearson, and has views of the surrounding mountain landscape. The property has been maintained for nearly 20 years by local landscapper Alden H. Hartke of Thornton, NH and the house is curranty a privately owned residence.

The house was listed on the National Register of Historic Places in 2012, and the New Hampshire State Register of Historic Places in 2011.

See also
National Register of Historic Places listings in Grafton County, New Hampshire

References

Houses on the National Register of Historic Places in New Hampshire
Architecture in New Hampshire
Queen Anne architecture in New Hampshire
Houses in Grafton County, New Hampshire
National Register of Historic Places in Grafton County, New Hampshire
New Hampshire State Register of Historic Places